The 2004 general elections defied the predictions made by pre-poll predictions and exit polls and allowed the newly formed UPA alliance led by Sonia Gandhi, to come to power. This election also saw the rise of marginalized parties like the left, to join forces with the opposition, which led to a major realignment in social and political power.
Though pre-poll predictions were for an overwhelming majority for the BJP, the exit polls (immediately after the elections and before the counting began) predicted a hung parliament. However, even the exit polls could only indicate the general trend and nowhere close to the final figures. There is also the general perception that as soon as the BJP started realising that events might not proceed entirely in its favour, it changed the focus of its campaign from India Shining to issues of stability. The Congress, who was regarded as "old-fashioned" by the ruling BJP, was largely backed by poor, rural, lower-caste and minority voters that did not participate in the economic boom of previous years that created a large wealthy middle class and thus achieved its overwhelming victory.

The reverses in the pre-poll predictions are ascribed to various reasons depending on the point of view.
 People were more concerned about issues of their immediate environment such as water scarcity, drought, etc., than national issues.
 The anti-incumbency factor was at work for the BJP allies.

State by State analysis

Andhra Pradesh

Source: NES Election 2004 Analysis

Karnataka

Source: NES Election 2004 Analysis

Kerala

Source: NES Election 2004 Analysis

Tamil Nadu

Source: NES Election 2004 Analysis

References

External links
 Verdict 2004

2004 Indian general election